Germán Ricardo Recio Cuevas (born April 7, 1988  in Neyba) is a male volleyball and beach volleyball player from Dominican Republic, who participated in the NORCECA Beach Volleyball Circuit 2009 with Yewddys Pérez.

At indoor volleyball, he earned the bronze medal at the 2008 Pan-American Cup with his national team.

He also earned two second places with Bahoruco at the Dominican Republic Volleyball League.

Clubs
  Bahoruco (2007–2008)
  Bahoruco (2010)
  Puñal (2010)
  La Romana (2013)

Awards

Individuals
 2014 Central American and Caribbean Games "Best Middle Blocker"

National Team

Indoor
 2008 Pan-American Cup  Bronze Medal

Beach Volleyball
 NORCECA Beach Volleyball Circuit Montelimar 2009  Bronze Medal

Clubs
 Dominican Republic Volleyball League 2007 & 2008 –  Runner-Up, with Bahoruco

References

External links
 
 FIVB Profile
 FEDOVOLI

1988 births
Living people
Dominican Republic men's volleyball players
Dominican Republic beach volleyball players
Men's beach volleyball players
Pan American Games competitors for the Dominican Republic
Beach volleyball players at the 2011 Pan American Games
Central American and Caribbean Games gold medalists for the Dominican Republic
Competitors at the 2014 Central American and Caribbean Games
Central American and Caribbean Games medalists in volleyball